Raymond Todd is an Australian philatelist who signed the Roll of Distinguished Philatelists in 2011.

References

Australian philatelists
Signatories to the Roll of Distinguished Philatelists
Living people
Year of birth missing (living people)